Hardy Aviation (N.T.) Pty Ltd, is an air charter company based at Darwin International Airport in Darwin, Northern Territory, Australia. It operates air charter services. Its main base is Darwin International Airport. 

Hardy Aviation is a member of the Regional Aviation Association of Australia (RAAA).

History 

Hardy Aviation was founded in 1991 by John Hardy.

In November 2008, Hardy Aviation created a subsidiary called Fly Tiwi.

In December 2012 Hardy Aviation and Fly Tiwi were grounded because senior pilots failed a review test. Hardy Aviation was allowed to resume operations shortly after. However, Hardy Aviation had to threaten legal action against Civil Aviation Safety Authority before Fly Tiwi could resume operations.

In 2014, Hardy Aviation constructed new facilities at Borroloola Airport, Northern Territory.

In March 2020, Hardy Aviation received financial support from the Northern Territory Government for the COVID-19 pandemic.

In April 2020, Hardy Aviation received financial support as part of the Australian Government's COVID-19 Regional Airline Network Support Program.

Fleet 

The Hardy Aviation fleet consists of the following aircraft:

See also 
 List of airlines of Australia
List of defunct airlines of Australia
 John Hardy (aviator)

References

External links 

 Hardy Aviation
Fly Tiwi
Regional Aviation Association of Australia
Short Biography of John Hardy

Airlines established in 1991
Australian companies established in 1991
Regional Aviation Association of Australia
Companies based in Darwin, Northern Territory
Transport in the Northern Territory